Kristine O'Brien (born October 3, 1991) is an American rower. In 2015 O'Brien, Adrienne Martelli, Grace Latz and Grace Luczak took the gold medal in the coxless four at the 2015 World Rowing Championships.

O'Brien and her twin sister were raised in Massapequa Park, New York, after moving to America from Ireland at two years old. A devout Catholic, she went to high school at St. John the Baptist Diocesan in West Islip. She rowed at the University of Virginia, and was named the 2012 USRowing Fan's Choice Collegiate Rower of the Year.

In 2018 she was selected to the women's eight and rowed bow-seat at the World Championships, obtaining the gold medal.

In 2019 she rowed 2-seat in the women's eight, earning bronze at the World Championships.

She qualified to represent the United States at the 2020 Summer Olympics. At these Olympics, she rowed stroke seat in the women's eight, leading the USA to first place in the heat and thereby qualifying directly to the A final. The American boat finished in fourth place in the A final, 1.57 seconds behind third place China.

References

External links

1991 births
Living people
American female rowers
World Rowing Championships medalists for the United States
Rowers at the 2020 Summer Olympics
Sportspeople from New York (state)
Virginia Cavaliers women's rowers